The 1984–85 Irish Cup was the 105th edition of Northern Ireland's premier football knock-out cup competition. It began on 19 January 1985, and concluded on 11 May 1985 with the replayed final.

Ballymena United were the defending champions after winning their 5th Irish Cup last season, defeating Carrick Rangers 4–1 in the 1984 final. This season they reached the semi-finals, but lost to Linfield. Glentoran won their 11th Irish Cup, defeating archrivals Linfield 1–0 in the final replay after the first game ended 1–1.

Results

First round

|}

Replays

|}

Second round

|}

Replay

|}

Quarter-finals

|}

Semi-finals

|}

Final

Replay

References

1984–85
1984–85 domestic association football cups
Cup